A boggart is a creature in English folklore, either a household spirit or a malevolent genius loci (that is, a geographically-defined spirit) inhabiting fields, marshes, or other topographical features. Other names of this group include bug, bugbear, bugaboo or bug-a-boo,  bogey, bogun, bogeyman, bogle, etc., presumably all derived from (or related to) Old English pūcel, and related to the Irish púca and the pwca or bwga of Welsh mythology.

The household form causes mischief and things to disappear, milk to sour, and dogs to go lame. The boggarts inhabiting marshes or holes in the ground are often attributed more serious evildoing, such as the abduction of children.

Background
Always malevolent, the household boggart will follow its family wherever they flee. It is said that the boggart crawls into people's beds at night and puts a clammy hand on their faces. Sometimes he strips the bedsheets off them. Sometimes a boggart will also pull on a person's ears. Hanging a horseshoe on the door of a house and leaving a pile of salt outside your bedroom are said to keep a boggart away.

In some areas, such as Northumberland, it was believed that helpful household sprites, "silkies" or "brownies", could turn into malevolent boggarts if offended or ill-treated.

In Northern England, at least, there was the belief that the boggart should never be named, for when the boggart was given a name, it would not be reasoned with nor persuaded, but would become uncontrollable and destructive (see True name). Within the folklore of North-West England, boggarts can cause mischief in homes but tend to live outdoors, in marshland, holes in the ground, under bridges and on dangerous sharp bends on roads. The book Lancashire Folklore of 1867, makes a distinction between "House boggarts" and other types. In Lancashire, a skittish or runaway horse was said to have "took boggarts"—that is, been frightened by a, usually invisible, boggart. When a person got lost in a marsh and was never seen again, the people were sure that a boggart had caught the poor unfortunate and devoured him. The name of at least one Lancashire boggart was recorded, "Nut-Nan", who flitted with a shrill scream among hazel bushes in Moston near Manchester. In Yorkshire, boggarts also inhabit outdoor locations, one is said to haunt Cave Ha, a limestone cavern at Giggleswick near Settle.

The Scots variant is the bogle (or boggle).

Appearance

The recorded folklore of boggarts is remarkably varied as to their appearance and size. Many are described as relatively human-like in form, though usually uncouth, very ugly and often with bestial attributes. T. Sternberg's 1851 book Dialect and Folk-lore of Northhamptonshire describes a certain boggart as "a squat hairy man, strong as a six year old horse, and with arms almost as long as tacklepoles".

Other accounts describe boggarts as having more completely beast-like forms. The "Boggart of Longar Hede" from Yorkshire was said to be a fearsome creature the size of a calf, with long shaggy hair and eyes like saucers. It trailed a long chain after itself, which made a noise like the baying of hounds. The "Boggart of Hackensall Hall" in Lancashire had the appearance of a huge horse.

At least one Lancashire boggart was said to sometimes take the forms of various animals, or indeed more fearful creatures. The boggarts of Lancashire were said to have a leader, or master, called 'Owd Hob', who had the form of a satyr or archetypical devil: horns, cloven hooves and a tail.

Grizlehurst boggart (Lancashire)
A piece of folklore concerning a Lancashire boggart was published in 1861; the author had a conversation with an elderly couple one evening about their local boggart. They maintained that the boggart was buried at a nearby bend in the road under an ash tree, along with a cockerel with a stake driven through it. Despite being buried, the boggart was still able to create trouble. A farmer's wife, the old couple claimed, just two weeks earlier had heard doors banging in her farmhouse at night, then loud laughter; she looked out to see three candles casting blue light and a creature with red burning eyes leaping about. The following morning many marks of cloven hooves were seen outside the house. The couple claimed that the boggart had unhitched their own horse and overturned their cart on occasion. "Never name it [the boggart]" the old man repeated, and stated that he would never dig near its grave.

The Farmer and the Boggart
In one old tale, said to originate from the village of Mumby in the Lincolnshire countryside, the boggart is described as being rather squat, hairy, and smelly. In the story, a farmer offers a deal to a boggart inhabiting his land; the boggart may choose either the part of the crop that grows above the ground or the part below it. When the boggart chooses the part below the ground, the farmer plants barley; at harvest time, the boggart is left with only stubble. The boggart then demands the part above ground instead, so the farmer plants potatoes.  Once again left with nothing to show for his efforts, the enraged boggart leaves the area.

An alternative telling includes a third episode where the farmer and the boggart are to harvest the crop (wheat) from either side of the field, each getting what he harvests.  However the farmer plants iron rods in the boggart's half before the reaping, blunting his scythe, and allowing the farmer to harvest almost the entire field.

This story is identical to the European fable The Farmer and the Devil, cited in many seventeenth-century French works. (See Bonne Continuation, Nina M. Furry et Hannelore Jarausch)

Geographical names

A variety of geographic locations and architectural landmarks have been named for the boggart.

There is a large municipal park called Boggart Hole Clough, which is bordered by Moston and Blackley in Manchester, England. Clough is a northern dialect word for a steep-sided, wooded valley; a large part of Boggart Hole Clough is made up of these valleys and is said to be inhabited by boggarts. The clough is the setting for many boggart stories, including one of how a local farmer, George Cheetham, and his family were forced to leave their home due to the torment inflicted by a boggart. However, as they were taking their possessions away in a cart, the voice of the boggart was heard issuing from a milk-churn on the cart. Unable to escape the boggart, they returned to their farm.

There is a Boggart Stones overlooking the place where the Moors Murderers, Ian Brady and Myra Hindley, buried the bodies of Lesley Ann Downey and Pauline Reade, children they had abducted. The children's bodies were buried just below the location, and in sight of, Boggart Stones (OS Map 1864).

There is a Boggart Bridge in Burnley, Lancashire, where tradition says that whoever crosses the bridge must give a living thing to the boggart or forfeit his or her soul.

Boggarts Roaring Holes are a group of potholes on the moors of Newby Moss near Clapham in the Yorkshire Dales. Legend has it that these potholes are the dwelling place of grotesque flesh-eating boggarts whose angry growls have allegedly been heard reverberating from the depths of the dark caverns beneath (hence the name).

In the Seacroft area of Leeds in West Yorkshire there is a council estate named Boggart Hill; Boggart Hill Drive, Boggart Hill Gardens and Boggart Hill were all given the name of the estate area.

Halfway between Scarborough and Whitby, on Robin Hood's Bay, there is a place called Boggle Hole. In the local mythology, a boggle is the local name for a hobgoblin, mischievous "little people" who were thought to live in caves along the coast. Boggle Hole is a natural cave formed by wave action where smugglers used to land their contraband in past times.

On Puck, a moon of Uranus, there is a crater named Bogle, in deference to the system of nomenclature on this satellite, whose features are all named after various mischievous spirits.

In popular culture

Boggarts feature prominently in a number of popular fantasy novels, in various incarnations. These include the "boggles" in C. S. Lewis' The Chronicles of Narnia, the boggart in Susan Cooper's The Boggart and The Boggart and the Monster, the boggart in the Septimus Heap series, the boggarts in Joseph Delaney's The Wardstone Chronicles, and the boggart in William Mayne's Earthfasts, and Tasha Tudor's Corgi-related picture books. Other books, including The Spiderwick Chronicles, and Mark Del Franco's Convergent World books feature brownies which turn into boggarts when angered.

The boggarts in J. K. Rowling's Harry Potter are shape-shifters whose true form is unknown, that change shape to resemble their beholder's worst fear (possibly inspired by the clutterbumph in Paul Gallico's Manxmouse). They are unlike most boggarts of British folklore, whose appearance is fixed. Their closest parallel, in being able to change shape at will, is probably to be found in a reference to a Lancashire boggart in the book Lancashire Folklore of 1867.

In the 2014 fantasy film Seventh Son an enormous malevolent boggart attacks the protagonists while they're on their journey to find the antagonist character. Boggarts also appear in the film's original source material, The Spook's Apprentice.
 
In the CITV children's show The Treacle People, boggarts are furry, gremlin-like creatures that originate from the Treacle Mines. They are mischievous, frequently playfighting and causing a mess. They serve as pets, friends and pests to the townspeople. They have the ability to walk up walls and other inclined surfaces due to their feet, which resemble plungers.

A boggart appears in Peter S. Beagle's novel Tamsin. He is described as a humanoid creature about a meter high who resents humans moving into his house and torments them with pranks and thievery. At first it seems he can become invisible, though it is later determined that he can hide in narrow cracks (between cupboards, under bathtubs, etc). As are many magical creatures in the book, the boggart is mortally afraid of cats.

In the Magic: The Gathering card game's Lorwyn block, the native goblins of the plane are called boggarts.

In role-playing games, the boggart appeared as the immature form of a will-o'-wisp with shape-shifting abilities in Dungeons & Dragons as well as Necromancer Games.

Kamen Rider Wizard features a villain of the week based on the boggart.

See also
 
Bogeyman (a being derived from the boggart)
Bogle
Brownie
Buggane
Domovoi
Gremlin
Hob (folklore)
Hobgoblin
Kobold
Poltergeist
Púca
Sprite
Tomte

References

References

Further reading
Young, Simon. The Boggart: Folklore, History, Place-names and Dialect. Exeter: University of Exeter Press, 2022. 330. .
Young, Simon, editor. The Boggart Sourcebook: Texts and Memories for the Study of the British Supernatural.  University of Exeter Press. e-book

English legendary creatures
Fairies
Devils
Household deities
Bogeymen